The 2016–17 Northeastern Huskies men's basketball team represented Northeastern University during the 2016–17 NCAA Division I men's basketball season. The Huskies, led by eleventh-year head coach Bill Coen, played their home games at Matthews Arena in Boston Massachusetts as members of the Colonial Athletic Association. They finished the season 15–16, 8–10 in CAA play to finish in sixth place. They lost in the quarterfinals of the CAA tournament to Towson.

Previous season 
The Huskies finished the 2015–16 season 18–15, 9–9 in CAA play to finish in sixth place. They defeated Towson to advance to the semifinals of the CAA tournament where they lost to UNC Wilmington.

Departures

Incoming Transfers

Recruiting

Roster

Schedule and results 

|-
!colspan=9 style=| Non-conference regular season

|-
!colspan=9 style=| CAA regular season

|-
!colspan=9 style=| CAA tournament

See also
2016–17 Northeastern Huskies women's basketball team

References

Northeastern Huskies men's basketball seasons
Northeastern